This is a list of notable Turkish philosophers, scientists and scholars.

A
 Ahmet Yesevi, philosopher
 Ahmet Resmi, historian 
 Ahi Çelebi, doctor 
 Silahdar Fındıklılı Mehmed Ağa, historian
 Ali Akansu – Electrical engineer
 İsmail Akbay – Engineer
 Selman Akbulut, mathematician
 Abdülkadir Topkaç, astronomer
 Alev Alatlı, economist
 Mustafa Âlî, historian
 Ahmet Alkan, economist
 Cahit Arf, mathematician
 Oruç Aruoba, poet, philosopher
 Aşıkpaşazade, historian
 'Abd al-Hamīd ibn Turk, mathematician

B
 Aykut Barka, earth scientist
 Asım Orhan Barut, University of Colorado-Boulder physicist
 Turhan Baytop, botanist
 Hulusi Behçet, dermatologist, physician and scientist
 Besim Ömer Akalın, physician 
 Orkut Büyükkökten, software engineer

C
 Katip Çelebi, historian, philosopher and geographer
 Tantek Çelik, computer scientist
 Erhan Çınlar, probabilist
 Cahit Arf, mathematician 
 Celal Şengör, geologist

D
 Hilmi Volkan Demir, scientist
 Arda Denkel, philosopher
 Naşide Gözde Durmuş, geneticist

E
 Ahmed Resmî Efendi, historian and diplomat
 Gelenbevi İsmail Efendi, mathematician
 Hoca Sadeddin Efendi, historian
 Yunus Emre, poet, mystic and philosopher
 Osman Nuri Eralp, veterinary scientist and microbiologist
 Ali Erdemir, scientist
 Elza Erkip, electrical and computer engineer
 Ayşe Erzan, theoretical physicist
 İbrahim Hakkı Erzurumi, philosopher and mystic

F

 Molla Şemseddin Fenari, logician, Islamic theologian
 Nusret Fişek, physician
 Al-Farabi (872–950) (Al-Farabi, Pharabius), philosopher of Turkish or Persian origin

G
 Erol Gelenbe, computer scientist
 Feza Gürsey, mathematician and physicist
 Nüzhet Gökdoğan, astronomer and mathematician
 Fatin Gökmen, astronomer

H
Haji Bektash Veli, mystic
Osman Hamdi Bey, archaeologist

I
 Masatoshi Gündüz Ikeda, mathematician
 Ataç İmamoğlu, physicist
 Erdal İnönü, physicist, politician
 Ahmet Mete Işıkara (1941-2013), seismologist

K
 İhsan Ketin (1914-1995), geologist
 Osman Kibar, engineer and founder of Biosplice
 Ioanna Kuçuradi (1936-), Professor of Philosophy, President of Turkish Philosophy Association
 Behram Kurşunoğlu (1922-2003), physicist
 Yalçın Küçük, economist, historian and sovietolog

M
 Mirim Çelebi, astronomer
 Janet Akyüz Mattei, astronomer
 Müneccimbaşı Ahmed Dede, astronomer, astrologer and historian
 Takiyettin Mengişoğlu, philosopher

N
 Mustafa Naima, historian
 Matrakçı Nasuh, mathematician, historian, geographer, cartographer, swordmaster, and miniaturist
 Leyla Neyzi, anthropologist, sociologist and historian

O
 Hakkı Ögelman, physicist and astrophysicist
 Mehmet Öz, surgeon and author
 Feryal Özel, astrophysicist 
 Hasan Özbekhan, scientist, cyberneticist, philosopher and planner who was Professor Emeritus

P
 Burçin Mutlu-Pakdil, astrophysicist
 Ahmet Cevdet Pasha, sociologist, legist and historian
 İbrahim Peçevi, historian
 Kadrî of Pergamon, linguist
 Plato of Athens, philosopher

Q
 Ali Kuşçu, astronomer, mathematician, physicist and scientist

R
 Piri Reis, cartographer and admiral
 Kemal Reis, cartographer
 Bursalı Kadızade Rumi, mathematician
 Seydi Ali Reis, cartographer

S
 Gülsün Sağlamer, architect
 Aziz Sancar, biochemist
 Aydın Sayılı - historian of science
 Mustafa Selaniki, historian
 Muzafer Sherif, social psychologist
 Oktay Sinanoğlu (1935–2015), theoretical chemist and molecular biologist
 Uğur Şahin, cancer research, immunology, CEO of BioNTech
 Celâl Şengör – geologist
 Sabuncuoğlu Şerafeddin, physician

T
 Takiyüddin, Ottoman polymath, astronomer
 Semih Tezcan, civil engineer
 Hüseyin Tevfik Pasha, mathematician
 Mehmet Toner, cryobiologist, biomedical engineer
 Özlem Türeci, physician, scientist and entrepreneur; co-founded the biotechnology company BioNTech

U
 Turgay Üzer, Georgia Institute of Technology Physicist

V
 Vamık Volkan (born 1932), psychiatrist and author

Y
 Nur Yalman, anthropologist
 Gazi Yaşargil – father of modern microneurosurgery
 Muhammed Hamdi Yazır - theologian
 Cem Yıldırım, mathematician
 Cemal Yıldırım - philosopher of science
 Yusuf Has Hacip, political scientist, astronomer, author
 Yunus Emre, poet

References 

Science and technology in Turkey
LIst
Philosophers and scientists
List
Turkish